Rome attack may refer to:

1973 Rome airport attacks and hijacking
1982 Great Synagogue of Rome attack
1985 Rome and Vienna airport attacks